How To Succeed With Women Without Really Trying: The Dastard's Guide To The Birds And Bees was a 1957 humor book by Shepherd Mead.

Mead's book satirized 1950s United States male-female relations, under the guise of a self-help book.  The book was originally published by Ballantine Books.

References

1957 books
Comedy books
Ballantine Books books
English-language books
American books
Satirical self-help books